The 2023 Super Cup, also known as the Hero Super Cup due to sponsorship ties with Hero MotoCorp, is the 3rd edition of the Super Cup and the 41st season of the national knockout competition for football clubs in India.

The tournament is being organised after a gap of 4 years due to various scheduling issues, with the latest edition being played in 2019, where FC Goa was crowned champions. The champions of this event will play an additional play-off against Gokulam Kerala, the champions of 2021–22 I-League for a place in the group stage of 2023–24 AFC Cup. If Gokulam Kerala a team qualified for AFC champions league indian additional playoffs win this event, then Gokulam Kerela will automatically qualify for the 2023–24 AFC Cup group stage. This is the first time the Super Cup champions will have a chance to participate in an AFC competition.

Format
The 2023 edition of Super Cup will be played across two cities of Kerala, Kozhikode and Manjeri, selected by the AIFF in a comprehensive and inclusive manner. The competition will consist of the qualifying play-offs, the group stage, the semi-finals and the final.

The tournament proper will feature 16 top clubs across the top two divisions of Indian football. All 11 clubs from the ISL and the 2022–23 I-League champions will directly qualify to the group stage. The teams placed 2nd to 10th in the 2022–23 I-League will compete for the four remaining spots in the qualifying round that will feature single-leg ties.

The 16 qualified clubs will be drawn into four groups of four each, competing in a single round-robin format, with group winners making it through to the semi-finals.

Teams

Venues
A total of 32 matches are expected to be played across 2 cities, Kozhikode and Manjeri. 19 matches are scheduled to be played in Kozhikode, including the qualifying play-offs, and 13 matches in Manjeri.

Qualifying rounds

|+First qualifying round 

|+Second qualifying round

First qualifying round

Second qualifying round

Group stage

Group A

Group B

Group C

Group D

Knockout stage

Bracket

Semi-finals

Final

See also
Indian club qualifiers for 2023–24 AFC competitions
2022–23 Indian Super League
2022–23 I-League
2022–23 I-League 2

References

2023 Super Cup
Super Cup (India)
2022–23 in Indian football
Indian Super Cup
India